Senator Barbour may refer to:

Members of the Northern Irish Senate
Harold Barbour (1874–1938), Northern Irish Senator from 1921 to 1929

Members of the United States Senate
James Barbour (1775–1842), U.S. Senator from Virginia from 1815 to 1825
John S. Barbour Jr. (1820–1892), U.S. Senator from Virginia from 1889 to 1892
William Warren Barbour (1888–1943), U.S. Senator from New Jersey from 1931 to 1937 and from 1938 to 1943

United States state senate members
Edward Barbour, Missouri State Senate
James J. Barbour (1869–1946), Illinois State Senate
John C. Barbour (1895–1962), New Jersey State Senate